Benjamin Weigelt (born 4 September 1982) is a German retired professional footballer who played as a left-back.

Career
Born in Bocholt, North Rhine-Westphalia, Weigelt played for former Bundesliga club KFC Uerdingen 05 as a youth. After four years there, he left the club and went to Rot-Weiß Essen where he also signed his first professional contract. After three years with many games he played he became the chance to sign with newly promoted 1. FSV Mainz 05. He competed for a place in the starting formation with Marco Rose, and finally won the race for it.

After another three years and Mainz' promotion to the 2. Bundesliga he decided to change the club and went to the rivals of Alemannia Aachen. The first six months were disappointing for Weigelt with only ten appearances on the field so that he and the club decided to loan him to 1. FC Kaiserslautern.

Once the coach decided not to use him on the field he left for league rivals FC St. Pauli in summer 2008 and left Hamburg after just on year on 3 June 2009 to sign with SV Wehen Wiesbaden.  On 28 June 2010, Weigelt signed a two-year deal to play for KSV Hessen Kassel, but left the club after one year. After six months without a club, he signed for RW Oberhausen in January 2012.

Notes

External links
 

1982 births
Living people
People from Bocholt, Germany
Sportspeople from Münster (region)
German footballers
Footballers from North Rhine-Westphalia
Association football fullbacks
Germany B international footballers
Rot-Weiss Essen players
1. FSV Mainz 05 players
Alemannia Aachen players
1. FC Kaiserslautern players
FC St. Pauli players
SV Wehen Wiesbaden players
KSV Hessen Kassel players
Rot-Weiß Oberhausen players
Bundesliga players
2. Bundesliga players
3. Liga players
Regionalliga players